Valea Muntelui may refer to:
 Valea Muntelui, a tributary of the Iza in Maramureș County, Romania
 Valea Muntelui, a tributary of the Valea Caselor in Sibiu County, Romania
 Valea Muntelui (Talna), a river in Satu Mare County, Romania